Monnières is the name of the following communes in France:

 Monnières, Jura, in the Jura department
 Monnières, Loire-Atlantique, in the Loire-Atlantique department